Stanislav Varga (born 8 October 1972) is a Slovak football manager and former player.

Career
Varga, a tall and commanding centre-back, was recruited by Peter Reid for £875,000 from Slovan Bratislava during the summer of 2000. Varga began his career at the Stadium of Light with an impressive opening day display in Sunderland's 1–0 victory over Arsenal, picking up the man of the match award. He scored his first Sunderland goal in a 2–0 win over West Ham in January 2001.

A regular in the international side with over fifty caps to his name, Varga has also captained his country on a number of occasions. He was first spotted by Peter Reid when playing for Slovakia in a friendly game against Norway before Euro 2000 and impressed the Black Cats' boss with the way he kept Tore André Flo and Ole Gunnar Solskjær out of the game.

He spent the end of 2001–02 on loan with West Bromwich Albion, helping the club get promoted to the Premier League. The towering centre back returned from a long-term injury to find himself out of the first team picture and his last game before going on loan ended when he was taken off at half-time at Old Trafford, where Sunderland lost 4–1. With Björklund and Jody Craddock ahead of him, Varga never really found his way back into the team, and was released in January 2003.

Less than a month later and Martin O'Neill had snapped up the defender on a short-term deal. Despite only making one appearance for Celtic in that time, he was rewarded with a two-year contract in July 2003. He was an ever-present in the side during the 2003–04 campaign and helped his new teammates to domestic glory, winning the domestic double of Scottish Premier League and Scottish Cup. In the League, Varga helped Celtic concede only 25 goals, which allowed the club to set a new league record of 25 straight wins (32 games unbeaten from the start of the season) and 77 home league games without defeat. He also contributed 7 goals in all competitions. Successive titles evaded Celtic in the 2004–05 season as they threw away the SPL title on the final day of the season, but they did manage to take consolation in the Scottish Cup Final, beating Dundee United 1–0, with Alan Thompson scoring the only goal of the game after 8 minutes from a free-kick. Throughout this season Varga proved to be a rock in the Celtic defence. He even got up-field to score six times, including one in Celtic's 3–1 defeat to A.C. Milan in the UEFA Champions League Group Stage. During this time he, like Stilian Petrov before him, had his name abbreviated by the Celtic following, Stanislav would now simply be known as "Stan" Varga to the Hoops supporters and Scottish media.

On 31 August 2006, he returned to Sunderland under new manager Roy Keane, a former colleague from Celtic, alongside Celtic's Ross Wallace, for a combined fee of up to £1,100,000. He scored his first goal in his second spell at Sunderland in a 4–1 loss at Preston North End in October 2006.

His strong and powerful presence, ability in the air and no nonsense defending has made him a rising fan favourite at the Stadium of Light. Having to act as a substitute behind first choice centre half Nyron Nosworthy, the Slovak chose a one-month loan deal to Burnley on 4 January 2008 to regain match-fitness. He was named in the Championship Team of the Week for his performance in Burnley's 1–0 win over Plymouth Argyle, his first league game for the club.

Sunderland released Varga at the end of the 2007–08 season.

Honours

As player
 Celtic
 Scottish Premier League:2003–04, 2005–06
 Scottish Cup: 2003–04, 2004–05
 Scottish League Cup: 2005–06

 Sunderland
 Football League Championship: 2006–07

As coach
 Tatran Prešov
 DOXXbet Liga: 2015–16
 Dukla B.Bystrica
 Druha Liga runners-up: 2021–22

References

External links

 Sunderland AFC profile
Stanislav Varga profile, detailed club and national team statistics, honours (palmares) and timeline

1972 births
Living people
People from Lipany
Sportspeople from the Prešov Region
Slovak footballers
Slovakia international footballers
Slovak expatriate footballers
Association football central defenders
Slovak football managers
1. FC Tatran Prešov players
ŠK Slovan Bratislava players
Sunderland A.F.C. players
West Bromwich Albion F.C. players
Celtic F.C. players
Burnley F.C. players
Slovak Super Liga players
Premier League players
Scottish Premier League players
Expatriate footballers in England
Expatriate footballers in Scotland
Slovak expatriate sportspeople in England
Slovak expatriate sportspeople in Scotland
Slovak expatriate sportspeople in Poland
ŠK Odeva Lipany managers
1. FC Tatran Prešov managers
FK Dukla Banská Bystrica managers
Sandecja Nowy Sącz managers
2. Liga (Slovakia) managers
Slovak Super Liga managers
I liga managers
Slovak expatriate football managers
Expatriate football managers in Poland